The 1974 Argentine Grand Prix was a Formula One motor race held in Buenos Aires on 13 January 1974. It was race 1 of 15 in both the 1974 World Championship of Drivers and the 1974 International Cup for Formula One Manufacturers. The 53-lap race was won by McLaren driver Denny Hulme after he started from tenth position. Niki Lauda finished second for the Ferrari team and his teammate Clay Regazzoni came in third.

For the first time, Formula One's visit to the Buenos Aires circuit saw them use the long and fast No.15 configuration, rather than the previously-used No.9 layout. This race was also the 8th and last victory of Hulme's Formula One career and, the last for a New Zealand driver.

Report

It had been one of the most frantic close seasons ever with only Ronnie Peterson, Denny Hulme, Carlos Reutemann and James Hunt remaining with their teams. Emerson Fittipaldi moved from Lotus to McLaren to be replaced by Jacky Ickx. McLaren now had sponsorship from Marlboro and Texaco. The team also entered a third car in their old colours of Yardley for Mike Hailwood. Hailwood's place at Surtees was taken by Jochen Mass where he partnered Carlos Pace, whilst Peter Revson had moved from McLaren to Shadow, where he was joined by Jean-Pierre Jarier.

Niki Lauda and Clay Regazzoni remained teammates but would be driving for Ferrari instead of BRM, who now with Motul sponsorship had three cars driven by Frenchmen Jean-Pierre Beltoise, Henri Pescarolo and François Migault. With the death of François Cevert and the retirement of Jackie Stewart, Tyrrell had an entirely new line-up in Jody Scheckter and Patrick Depailler.

Wilson Fittipaldi left Formula One to start his own team, so his place along Reutemann at Brabham was taken by Richard Robarts. A privateer Brabham was run by John Goode Racing for John Watson under the Hexagon of Highgate banner. Howden Ganley and Hans Stuck were picked up by March Engineering.

Marlboro continued to back Frank Williams and his Iso-Marlboro-Ford FW for former Ferrari driver, Arturo Merzario. While Hesketh Racing were building their own car back in England, they entered James Hunt in a year-old March, while Graham Hill had Lola Cars build two cars for himself and Guy Edwards. Rikky von Opel completed the field, once again driving for Team Ensign.

Qualifying

Peterson secured pole position, for John Player Team Lotus, averaging a speed of 120.542 mph. However, Scuderia Ferrari showed how much progress they had made during the winter, under the new management, led by Luca di Montezemolo, with Regazzoni qualifying alongside the Swede on the front row. The second row featured the McLaren of Fittipaldi and the Shadow of Revson, while James Hunt impressed in his Harvey Postlethwaite modified Hesketh March by taking fifth place on the grid.

Race

Peterson took an early lead from the fast starting Hunt, while Regazzoni, Revson and Hailwood all arrived at the first corner together and collided. Regazzoni and Revson spun, then Revson’s team-mate, Jarier ran into him. The cars of Mezario and Watson were also damaged in the melee, as Scheckter took to the grass in avoidance.

After Hunt spun later on the opening lap, Reutemann moved into second, with Fittipaldi, Hailwood, Ickx and Hulme completing the top six. By lap three, Reutemann took the lead, while Fittipaldi visited the pits to have a plug lead reattached. This promoted Hailwood to third. By this stage, Ickx had dropped behind Hulme, but soon both were past the Yardley McLaren. Peterson began to fade due to brake trouble and was overtaken by Hulme and Ickx. By now Ickx was beginning to come under pressure from the Ferrari of Niki Lauda.

On lap 27, the second Lotus was now in trouble, as Ickx pitted with a puncture. This left Lauda in a solid third place. The local hero, Reutemann seem to have the race under control when his Cosworth powered Brabham BT44 began to misfire and Hulme rapidly closed him down. On the penultimate lap, Hulme was past, taking the lead. As for Reutemann, his eventually ground to a halt on the last lap, running out of fuel, and was classified seventh overall. As a result, the Ferraris of Lauda and Regazzoni inherited a two-three at the finish.

Hulme won in a time of 1hr 41:02.010mins., averaging a speed of 117.405 mph, and was 9.27 seconds ahead of Lauda. Regazzoni was a further 11.14 seconds behind. Only other drivers to complete the full race distance were Hailwood, Beltoise and Depailler.

Classification

Qualifying

Race

Championship standings after the race

Drivers' Championship standings

Constructors' Championship standings

Note: Only the top five positions are included for both sets of standings.

References

Argentine Grand Prix
Argentine Grand Prix
Grand Prix
Argentine Grand Prix